James George Facey Matthews (27 September 1876 – 8 October 1963) was an Australian sportsman who played Australian rules football for North Adelaide in the South Australian Football Association (SAFA) and, as a cricketer, played seven Sheffield Shield matches for South Australia.

Matthews was a member of North Adelaide's first three premiership sides, in 1900, 1902 and 1905. He started his career as a forward and topped the club's goalkicking in his debut season before moving into the centre later in his career. Matthews finished his career as a fullback and twice represented South Australia at interstate football. In 1906 he captained North Adelaide, who finished second.

External links

Cricinfo profile

1876 births
1963 deaths
Australian cricketers
South Australia cricketers
North Adelaide Football Club players
Australian rules footballers from South Australia
Cricketers from South Australia